The final round of the EuroBasket Women 2015 took place between 24 and 28 June 2015 with all games played at Syma Sport and Events Centre in Budapest, Hungary.

The four best ranked teams from each group of second round advanced.

Qualified teams

All times are local (UTC+2).

Bracket
5–8th place bracket

Quarterfinals

5–8th place semifinals

Semifinals

Seventh place game

Fifth place game

Third place game

Final

External links
Official website

Final
2014–15 in Spanish women's  basketball
2014–15 in Turkish basketball
2014–15 in Lithuanian basketball
2014–15 in French basketball
2014–15 in Russian basketball
2014–15 in Serbian basketball
2014–15 in Belarusian basketball
2014–15 in Montenegrin basketball